Tetsuya Umeda is a Japanese interactive performance artist working with musicians.

Umeda has also participated in the "1st Aichi Triennale 2010: Arts and Cities", Nagoya (2010); "Double Vision: Contemporary Art From Japan”, Moscow Museum of Modern Art, Moscow / Haifa Museum of Art, Haifa (2012); "Simple Interactions. Sound Art from Japan", The Museum of Contemporary Art, Roskilde, Roskilde (2011); and is recently featured at "RhythmScape", Gyoenggi Museum of Modern Art, Gyoenggi (2015) and "Sounds of Us", Trafó Gallery, Budapest (2015–2016).

Solo exhibits include: “Criterium 73: Tetsuya Umeda”, Contemporary Art Gallery, Art Tower Mito (2008), “Hotel New Osorezan”, Ota Fine Arts Singapore, Singapore (2013), “Age0”, Breaker Project, Osaka (2014), “Science of Superstition” SonicProtest Festival, Montreuil (2015).

References

Official site:  http://siranami.com/

Living people
Year of birth missing (living people)
Place of birth missing (living people)
Japanese performance artists